Hoseynabad-e Bahar (also Romanized as Ḩoseynābād-e Bahār; also known as Ya‘qūb Shāh) is a village in Simineh Rud Rural District, in the Central District of Bahar County, Hamadan Province, Iran. At the 2006 census, its population was 3,300, in 810 families.

References 

Populated places in Bahar County